The 3rd IAAF World Cup in Athletics was an international track and field sporting event sponsored by the International Association of Athletics Federations, held on September 4–6, 1981, at the Stadio Olimpico in Rome, Italy.

Overall results

Medal summary

Men

Women

External links
World Cup Results
Full Results by IAAF

IAAF Continental Cup
World Cup
IAAF World Cup
World Cup